German submarine U-673 was a Type VIIC U-boat of Nazi Germany's Kriegsmarine during World War II. The submarine was laid down on 20 January 1942 at the Howaldtswerke yard at Hamburg, launched on 27 February 1943, and commissioned on 8 May 1943 under the command of Oberleutnant zur See Gerhard Haelbich.

Attached to 5th U-boat Flotilla based at Kiel, U-673 completed her training period on 31 May 1944 and was assigned to front-line service.

Design
German Type VIIC submarines were preceded by the shorter Type VIIB submarines. U-673 had a displacement of  when at the surface and  while submerged. She had two shafts and two  propellers.

U-673 was fitted with five  torpedo tubes (four fitted at the bow and one at the stern), fourteen torpedoes, one  SK C/35 naval gun, (220 rounds), one  Flak M42 and two twin  C/30 anti-aircraft guns. The boat had a complement of between forty-four and sixty.

Service history

On 14 September 1944, U-673 left St. Nazaire, France, for Norway, reaching Bergen on 19 October 1944. There the U-boat joined a convoy south. Later the U-boat was salvaged and towed to Stavanger. U-673 remained in Stavanger for the rest of the war and became British war booty in 1945. In 1946 the U-boat was broken up for scrap.

References

Bibliography

External links

German Type VIIC submarines
1943 ships
Ships built in Hamburg
U-boats commissioned in 1943
U-boats sunk in 1944
U-boats sunk in collisions
Maritime incidents in October 1944
World War II shipwrecks in the North Sea
World War II submarines of Germany